Bruce Marshall may refer ro:

 Bruce Marshall (writer), Scottish writer
 Bruce Marshall (ice hockey), NCAA ice hockey coach
 Bruce Marshall (taxonomist), New Zealand taxonomist
 Bruce D. Marshall, American Catholic theologian